Bashar al-Zoubi, also known as Abu Fadi, is a Free Syrian Army general, who defected from the Syrian Army to the FSA. He holds the position of Commander-in-Chief of the Southern Front, the stronger of the two fronts of the national opposition, and as such, he is de facto the strongest leader in the national opposition. He is also head of the Yarmouk Brigade. He is also a wealthy businessman who made his fortune in the tourism industry and hails from the powerful al-Zoubis clan.

References

Members of the Free Syrian Army
Syrian generals
Living people
Year of birth missing (living people)